Tetragonoderus eximius is a species of beetle in the family Carabidae. It was described by Theodor Franz Wilhelm Kirsch in 1873.

References

eximius
Beetles described in 1873